7 mm scale, also known as British 0 scale is a model railway scale of 1:43.5 (or 7 mm to 1 ft; hence its name).  The scale is thus different from American 0 scale (1:48) and European 0 scale (1:45) For standard gauge railways, 32mm gauge, or 0 gauge is most commonly used.  ScaleSeven (S7) standard however specifies 33 mm gauge, which is closer to scale.  For narrow gauge modelling, 16.5 mm gauge